Look Effects was a visual effects company based in Culver City, California. It was founded in 1998, and in 2014 ceased operations, with the staff acquired by Mass Market. They specialized in visual effects for feature films, episodic television, and special venue. Look Effects worked on over 100 major motion pictures and television series including Black Swan, Avatar, Captain America, and The Muppets Movie

History 
1998 Look Effects forms in Hollywood, California
2008 Opened Look Effects NY in Brooklyn, New York
2011 Look Effects relocates from Hollywood to the border of Culver City, California, and Marina del Rey, California
2011 Opened Look Effects Vancouver in Gastown Vancouver, British Columbia, Canada
2013 Opened Look Effects Germany in Stuttgart, Germany

Notable films

2006 
 The Fountain

2010 
 Black Swan

2012 
 Moonrise Kingdom

2013 
 Noah

Notable TV series 
 Bones
 Lost
 Nashville
 Pushing Daisies
 Game of Thrones

References 

Look Effects Does More With Less CG on The Fountain
Professional Spotlight: Henrik Fett and Mark Driscoll at FMX 2012
LOOK Effects Helps Secure Funding for Wes Anderson Feature

External links 
Official Website
Official Company IMDB
Official Company Twitter
Official Company Facebook

Visual effects companies